Tele 5 is a German free-to-air television channel that broadcasts classic American films, series, cartoons and Japanese anime.

On 3 July 2020, Discovery, Inc. agreed to acquire the channel from Leonine Holding, completing the purchase on 1 September 2020. It then became part of the Warner Bros. Discovery EMEA subsidiary of Warner Bros. Discovery International on April 8, 2022, when Discovery, Inc. merged with WarnerMedia. Now under the latter's management, it would be merged into Warner Bros. Discovery's existing cable unit, with corresponding job losses due to redundancies.

History 

Tele 5 replaced Germany's second music television channel, Musicbox, which existed from 1984 to 1988. Prior to 1987, Silvio Berlusconi bought part of Musicbox and rebranded it as Tele5 on 11 January 1988. Its programming was produced in the same building as Musicbox, a music video show named Musicbox remained part of Tele5's regular schedule, and several Musicbox show hosts transferred to Tele5.
From 1988 to 1992, Tele5 was part of Berlusconi's Europe-wide network of sister channels, all with the number 5 in their names and a stylized flower in their logo, which included Canale 5 in Italy, Telecinco in Spain (originally also styled as Tele5), and La Cinq in France (which was later replaced by France 5). Tele5 timeshared with RTL Television (then RTLplus) on terrestrial television from 8:00am or 9:00am to 5:00pm, and at night.

During the channel's four-year lifespan, its children's programming in particular increasingly took market share from Leo Kirch's German television networks, which prompted Kirch to buy the channel in 1992, and rebrand it DSF (Deutsches Sportfernsehen, German Sport Television) on 1 January 1993.

Bim Bam Bino 

"Bim Bam Bino" was the name of a children's show. A  mouse called Bino served as "announcer" between the different TV series often consisting of animated shows, including He-Man and the Masters of the Universe, Bobobobs, The Raccoons, Filmation Ghostbusters, Around the World with Willy Fog, The Adventures of Teddy Ruxpin, Alvin and the Chipmunks, The Smurfs, Fantastic Max, Grimm's Fairy Tale Classics, Saber Rider, Queen Millennia, Captain Future, or Anne of Green Gables.

At the time, most other channels had a few weekly or daily series for children. Some channels had "double features". "Bim Bam Bino" was the first big all-week program block for children and teens on German television. Initially broadcast in the morning hours, the show soon grew to encompass afternoons and eventually even early evenings. At the time the channel went off-air, "Bim Bam Bino" made up the biggest part of Tele 5's schedule and ran from about 9am to 6 or 7pm.

Legacy shows 

Some shows which had their German premiere on Tele5's first incarnation went on to find a new home. Bim Bam Bino was taken up by kabel eins, while the original Bim Bam Bino crew went on to produce a similar children's programming puppet announcer show Vampy on RTL II. Many cartoon shows previously broadcast on Tele5 as part of Bim Bam Bino initially  reappeared on the kabel 1 version of Bim Bam Bino and on RTL II's Vampy.

Bitte lächeln (a format based upon America's Funniest Home Videos) was the only Tele5 show that was briefly taken up by its successor DSF before moving on to RTL II, and later ran under the new title Schwupps - Die Pannenshow on Tm3, and which was hosted by Mike Carl for its entire run across all three channels. By the time Bitte lächeln aka Schwupps had moved to Tm3, a few of the cartoon shows originally on Tele5 were also taken up by Tm3 for its morning slots.

The most successful survivor of the old Tele5 was the game show Ruck Zuck (based on Bruce Forsyth's Hot Streak), which remained in production for over a decade on various channels after the closure of the old Tele5, appearing on RTL II, tm3, and even the new Tele 5 (see below).

Relaunch 

In April 2002, Tele München Gruppe relaunched the channel, now centred on movies and TV series. Tele 5's second incarnation originally started with Jochen Kröhne as CEO, who had been program director of Musicbox (1984-1988) as well as of Tele5's original incarnation (1988-1992). Kröhne left the new Tele 5 in 2005 and was replaced as CEO by Kai Blasberg. Jochen Bendel, a host on the original Tele5, appeared on the channel from the beginning, including by hosting new editions of the game show Ruck Zuck, until he left the network in 2005.

Logos

Programming
The channel offers various types of programming.

Shows 

 Kalkofes Mattscheibe Rekalked (2012–present)
 Die schlechtesten Filme aller Zeiten (2013–present)
 Der Klügere kippt nach – talk show, with Hugo Egon Balder and Hella von Sinnen
 Frau Dingens will zum Fernsehen
 Playlist – Sound of my Life
 Höggschde Konzentration – with Dominik Kuhn
 Ruck Zuck (2004–2005)
 Nachtfalke (2003–2005) – late night show
 Who wants to fuck my girlfriend? – game show/satire, with Christian Ulmen
 Vor Tele 5 (newscasts)

Series 

 21 Jump Street (21 Jump Street - Tatort Klassenzimmer) (2002-2005)
 Akte X (The X-Files) (2010-2012)
 Andromeda (2006-2013)
 Babylon 5 (2010-2015)
 Battlestar Galactica (2013–present)
 Blood Ties (Blood Ties - Biss aufs Blut) (2017–present)
 Boy Machine (2017)
 Caprica (2014-2015)
 Dark Matter (2017–present)
 Defiance (2014-2015)
 Earth: Final Conflict (2007-2011)
 Eine himmlische Familie (7th Heaven) (2012)
 Extralarge (Zwei Supertypen in Miami) (2003, 2005, 2007-2009, 2013-2014, 2017)
 Firefly (2016-2017)
 Lucha Underground (2017–2019)
 Schönheit hat ihren Preis (Nip/Tuck) (2009-2010)
 NTSF:SD:SUV:: (2015-2016)
 Pretender (2006-2010)
 Prime Suspect (Heißer Verdacht) (2007-2008, 2010-2011)
 Sharknado (2014–present)
 Smallville (2010-2013)
 Star Trek: Enterprise (2013-2015)
 Star Trek: Deep Space Nine (2012–present)
 Star Trek: The Next Generation (2011–present)
 Star Trek: The Original Series (2016–present)
 Star Trek: Voyager (2012–present)
 Stargate Atlantis (2011-2012, 2014, 2016–present)
 Stargate SG-1 (2005-2017)
 Stargate Universe (2014-2015, 2017)
 The Bold and the Beautiful (Reich und Schön) (1988-1990, 2002, 2012-2016)
 The Love Boat (Love Boat) (1992)
 Walker, Texas Ranger (2009-2012)
 Xena (2013-2016)

Anime 

 Attack No. 1 (Mila Superstar)
 Black Lagoon
 Captain Tsubasa (Die tollen Superstars)
 Crush Gear Turbo
 Digimon (2005, 2011, 2017)
 Dragon Ball Z
 Guilty Crown
 Mobile Suit Gundam Wing
 One Piece
 Sailor Moon
 Yu-Gi-Oh! Duel Monsters

Austrian feed 
An Austrian feed of Tele5 started broadcasting on 1 May 2012. It simulcasts the German channel's programming with the addition of local advertisements. It also includes promotions for the Austrian channel ATV. ATV also acts as the advertising sales representative.

HD feed 

Since 19 October 2011 Tele 5 broadcasts in HD on HD+, a satellite television platform owned by SES-Astra. Like most channels in Europe broadcasting in HD, its SD feed is a downscaled version of its main high-definition programming. Tele5 HD is also distributed in Vodafone and Telekom Entertain.

References

External links
 Official Site 
 Tele 5 Chronic  
 Tele 5 at LyngSat Address

Television stations in Germany
Television channels and stations established in 1988
Television channels and stations disestablished in 1992
Television channels and stations established in 2002
German-language television stations
1988 establishments in West Germany
1992 disestablishments in Germany
2002 establishments in Germany
Mass media in Munich
Warner Bros. Discovery networks